The Trial: The State of Russia vs Oleg Sentsov is a documentary film directed by Askold Kurov. It tells about the case of Ukrainian director Oleg Sentsov, who was detained by Russian special services in Crimea and sentenced to 20 years in prison.

Production 
Kurov shot preliminary court sessions and filmed conversations with Sentsov's sister Natalia in Moscow. Ukrainian director Andriy Litvinenko filmed episodes involving Sentsov's friends and AutoMaidan participants in Ukraine. Video interviews were recorded in support of Sentsov with celebrities from around the world. An Indiegogo crowdfunding campaign set a goal of €12,500, but collected commitments of only €1,750. However, a campaign on the Ukrainian platform of the Community Fund raised UAH 45,200.

Release 
The world premiere took place on February 11, 2017 at the 67th Berlin International Film Festival, where it was presented in the Berlinale Special section. The Ukrainian premiere took place at the end of March 2017 at the international documentary film festival on human rights Docudays UA.

References

External links 
 
 Official site of the film on Facebook

2010s Russian-language films
Documentary films about human rights